Waves is the fifth studio album by British progressive/experimental rock band Jade Warrior released in 1975 by Island Records. The album, written, recorded and produced by Jon Field and Tony Duhig with guest musicians (Steve Winwood among them) consisted of one single composition which in the pre-CD days had to be divided into two parts to fit A and B sides.

Style and concept 
Jade Warrior's second of the four island albums was dedicated to "the last whale". It had no recurring theme and was marked by a slightly jazzier feel than its predecessor, carrying a listener "through dawn-lit countryside full of birdsong, downriver to the ocean, and out among the great whales". Describing the band's musical vision at the time as "increasingly exotic", AllMusic found the island albums "dreamlike, pushing a lighter jazz sound to the forefront", featuring "myriad percussive sounds but drum kits were rarely in evidence". "The band liked to create a soothing, ethereal feel, then shatter it with gongs and unexpectedly raucous electric guitar, usually from guest David Duhig, Tony's brother. The albums featured occasional celebrity guests such as Steve Winwood, but Jade Warrior had a style of its own", critic Casey Elston wrote.

Track listing

Personnel 
 Tony Duhig – guitars, percussion, keyboards, production
 Jon Field – flutes, guitar, percussion, production
 Dave Duhig – lead guitar
 Graham Morgan – drums
 Suzi – vocals
 Maggie Thomas – alto recorder
 Steve Winwood – keyboards, Moog synthesizer, piano
 Tom Newman – audio engineer, engineer
 Mick Glossop – audio engineer
 David Platt – liner notes
 Mark Powell – reissue producer

References 

1975 albums
Jade Warrior (band) albums
Island Records albums